HD 100777 b, formally named Laligurans, is an extrasolar planet located approximately 172 light-years away in the constellation of Leo, orbiting the star HD 100777. This is a >1.17 M planet taking 33.15 Ms to orbit at 154.1 Gm or 4.99 μpc from the star at 36% eccentricity. The velocity of the orbit is 29.3 km/s. Dominique Naef discovered this planet in March 2007 by using HARPS spectrograph located in Chile.

See also 
 HD 190647 b
 Pipitea (planet)

References

External links 
 

Exoplanets discovered in 2007
Giant planets
Leo (constellation)
Exoplanets detected by radial velocity
Exoplanets with proper names